Alexander Smith (28 January 1874 – 21 April 1930) was a Scottish-American professional golfer who played in the late 19th and early 20th century. He was a member of a famous Scottish golfing family. His brother Willie won the U.S. Open in 1899, and Alex won it in both 1906 and 1910. Like many British professionals of his era he spent much of his adult life working as a club professional in the United States.

Early life
Smith was born in Dundee, Scotland, on 28 January 1874, the son of John D. Smith and Joann Smith née Robinson. On 18 January 1895 he was married to Jessie Maiden—sister of James Maiden—and they had two daughters, Fannie and Margaret, born in 1896 and 1899, respectively. Smith was sometimes referred to as "Alec" Smith, especially early in his career.

Golf career
He was the head professional at Nassau Country Club in Glen Cove, New York, from 1901 through 1909. James Maiden, who would forge a successful golf career of his own, served as assistant professional under Smith at Nassau.

In 1901, Smith lost to Willie Anderson in a playoff for the U.S. Open title. Smith's 1906 U.S. Open victory came at the Onwentsia Club in Lake Forest, Illinois. His 72-hole score of 295 was the lowest at either the U.S. Open or the British Open up to that time, and he won $300. The 1910 U.S. Open was played over the St. Martin's course at the Philadelphia Cricket Club. Smith won a three-man playoff against American John McDermott and another of his own brothers, Macdonald Smith. Alex Smith played in eighteen U.S. Opens in total and accumulated eleven top ten placings.

Smith, who partnered with C. A. Dunning in the 1905 Metropolitan Open four-ball tournament held on 16 September 1905 at Fox Hills Golf Club on Staten Island, tied for first place with George Low and Fred Herreshoff with a score of 71. A playoff wasn't held due to the fact that Smith was also competing in the medal competition which he won from Willie Anderson.

Smith also won the Western Open twice and the Metropolitan Open four times.

Later life

In 1910, Smith was a widower and lived with his two young daughters and sister-in-law, Allison Barry, in New Rochelle, New York. He was the head professional at the Westchester Country Club in Rye, New York. After the death of his brother, Willie Smith, he took over responsibility for the design of Club de Golf Chapultepec, which has hosted the Mexican Open multiple times, and the WGC-Mexico Championship since 2017.

Death and legacy
Smith died on 21 April 1930 at a sanatorium in Baltimore, Maryland.

Tournament wins
Note: This list may be incomplete
1903 Western Open
1905 Metropolitan Open
1906 U.S. Open, Western Open
1909 Metropolitan Open
1910 U.S. Open, Metropolitan Open
1913 Metropolitan Open

Major championships

Wins (2)

1Defeated John McDermott and MacDonald Smith in an 18-hole playoff – A. Smith 71 (−2), McDermott 75 (+2) & M. Smith 77 (+4).

Results timeline
Smith died before the Masters Tournament was founded.

NYF = Tournament not yet founded
NT = No tournament
DNP = Did not play
WD = Withdrew
"T" indicates a tie for a place
Green background for wins. Yellow background for top-10

Team appearances
France–United States Professional Match (representing the United States): 1913

References

External links
Wawashkamo Golf Club Scottish Links Course designed by Alex Smith on Mackinac Island, Michigan
Article on early Scottish golfers in the U.S. (including the Smith brothers)

Scottish male golfers
Winners of men's major golf championships
Golf course architects
Golfers from Carnoustie
Sportspeople from Angus, Scotland
Scottish emigrants to the United States
1874 births
1930 deaths